Shukuru Jumanne Kawambwa is a Tanzanian CCM politician and Member of Parliament for Bagamoyo constituency since 2005. He is the former Minister of Education and Vocational Training. He has also served as the Minister of Infrastructure Development

References

1957 births
Living people
Chama Cha Mapinduzi MPs
Tanzanian MPs 2010–2015
Government ministers of Tanzania
Tambaza Secondary School alumni
Mazengo Secondary School alumni
University of Dar es Salaam alumni
Alumni of the University of Reading
Alumni of the University of Surrey